Colea is a genus of flowering plants belonging to the family Bignoniaceae.

Its native range is Western Indian Ocean.

Species:

Colea alata 
Colea alba 
Colea ambrensis 
Colea asperrima 
Colea barbatula 
Colea bernieri 
Colea campenonii 
Colea colei 
Colea comorensis 
Colea concinna 
Colea darainensis 
Colea decaryi 
Colea delphinensis 
Colea floribunda 
Colea fusca 
Colea gentryi 
Colea hirsuta 
Colea labatii 
Colea lantziana 
Colea lutescens 
Colea muricata 
Colea myriaptera 
Colea nana 
Colea obtusifolia 
Colea pauciflora 
Colea purpurascens 
Colea ratovosonii 
Colea resupinata 
Colea rosea 
Colea rubra 
Colea seychellarum 
Colea sytsmae 
Colea tetragona 
Colea unifoliolata 
Colea velutina

References

Bignoniaceae
Bignoniaceae genera